Tantilla melanocephala,  commonly known as the black-headed snake, is a species of small colubrid snake endemic to Central America and South America.

Geographic range
In Central America it is found from Guatemala south to Panama. In South America it is found from Trinidad and Tobago south to northern Argentina.

Description

Dorsally, it is pale brown or red, and some specimens also have 3 or 5 narrow brown stripes. The top of the head and neck are black or dark brown. Ventrally, it is yellowish white.

The dorsal scales are smooth, without apical pits, and arranged in 15 rows at midbody.

References

External links
Tantilla melanocephala on Flickr.

Further reading
Freiberg, M. 1982. Snakes of South America. T.F.H. Publications. Hong Kong. 189 pp. . (Tantilla melanocephala, p. 111.)
Linnaeus, C. 1758. Systema naturæ per regna tria naturæ, secundum classes, ordines, genera, species, cum characteribus, differentiis, synonymis, locis. Tomus I. Editio Decima, Reformata. L. Salvius. Stockholm. 824 pp. (Coluber melanocephalus, p. 218.)

Colubrids
Snakes of Central America
Snakes of North America
Snakes of South America
Snakes of the Caribbean
Reptiles of Belize
Reptiles of Bolivia
Reptiles of Brazil
Reptiles of Colombia
Reptiles of Costa Rica
Reptiles of Ecuador
Reptiles of El Salvador
Reptiles of French Guiana
Reptiles of Guatemala
Reptiles of Guyana
Reptiles of Honduras
Reptiles of Nicaragua
Reptiles of Panama
Reptiles of Paraguay
Reptiles of Peru
Reptiles of Suriname
Reptiles of Trinidad and Tobago
Reptiles of Venezuela
Reptiles described in 1758
Taxa named by Carl Linnaeus